Forest Home Cemetery is a historic rural cemetery located in the Lincoln Village neighborhood of Milwaukee, Wisconsin and is the final resting place of many of the city's famed beer barons, politicians and social elite. Both the cemetery and its Landmark Chapel are listed on the National Register of Historic Places and were declared a Milwaukee Landmark in 1973.

The cemetery is run by a non-profit organization held in public trust. Profits from each sale are reinvested to insure continual care of the buildings and land. Its Victorian landscape contains over 100 species of trees, along with many ornate statues, crypts and monuments.

History 
A committee appointed by members of St. Paul's Episcopal Church in 1847 established Forest Home Cemetery on what would later become Milwaukee's south side. When the land was selected it was located nearly two miles outside of the city limits along the newly built Janesville Plank Road (now Forest Home Avenue), in an area believed to be far enough from urban development to remain rural. Increase A. Lapham planned the original cemetery, including the curving roads, in 1850. Orville Cadwell was the first burial on August 5, 1850, but was soon joined by others due to an outbreak of cholera in the city.

This location was dotted by Paleo Indian burial mounds and intersected a large collection of effigy mounds known to settlers as the Indian Fields. It contained over sixty earthworks which were catalogued by pioneer scientist Increase A. Lapham, including a rare intaglio of a panther, none of which remains today. An Indian village populated the corner near what is now Lincoln Avenue that grew corn on the hills. They most likely chose this location due to its proximity to the Kinnickinnic River.

Construction of the Gothic Revival style Landmark Chapel started in 1890 and took two years to complete. It was designed by architects George Ferry & Alfred Clas and built using Lake Superior Sandstone, a dark red sandstone found near the Apostle Islands in Lake Superior. A leaded glass conservatory containing decades-old tropical plants extends from the north and south sides of the nave.

Modern improvements within Forest Home Cemetery include two large mausoleums. The Halls of History is an indoor temperature controlled mausoleum and community center. Along with the columbarium and crypts it houses, the center contains a number of permanent and changing exhibits that educate visitors about the history of Milwaukee and over 100 of its people. It is open for walk-ins during office hours. Adjacent to this is a large terraced outdoor mausoleum called Chapel Gardens. It contains above ground burials in porticos set by ornate colonnades, statues, and rose gardens.

Notable interments 

Forest Home Cemetery is home to 28 Milwaukee mayors, seven Wisconsin governors, noted industrialists and over 110,000 burials. The Newhall House Monument is a mass grave for 64 people of the Newhall House fire of 1883, in which 71 individuals (43 unidentified) died.

 George A. Abert, member of the Wisconsin State Senate and Wisconsin State Assembly
 George G. Abert, member of the Wisconsin State Assembly
 Gerhard Bading, mayor and U.S. Minister to Ecuador
 Sherburn Becker, known as the "boy mayor" of Milwaukee
 Meta Schlichting Berger, female socialist organizer and advocate for improved public schooling systems
 Victor Berger, newspaper editor, U.S. congressman, and founding member of the Socialist Party of America
 Jacob Best, founder of what became the Pabst Brewing Company
 Valentin Blatz, founder of the Valentin Blatz Brewing Company
 Sherman Booth, newspaper editor and abolitionist
 Lynde Bradley, co-founder of the Allen-Bradley corporation
 James S. Brown, U.S. Congressman and first Attorney General of Wisconsin
 Thomas H. Brown, twice named Mayor of Milwaukee
 George Brumder, newspaper publisher (largest circulation of German language papers in the U.S.)
 Ammi R. Butler, 23rd Mayor of Milwaukee
 Alfred L. Cary, prominent lawyer and member of the Wisconsin State Assembly.
 John W. Cary, prominent lawyer, mayor of Racine, Wisconsin, member of the Wisconsin State Senate.
 Enoch Chase, member of the Wisconsin Legislature
 Horace Chase, politician who served as mayor of Milwaukee
 Hans Crocker, editor of Milwaukee's first newspaper and politician
 Lysander Cutler, politician and Union Army general during the American Civil War
 Arthur Davidson, One of the four original founders of the Harley-Davidson Motorcycle Company
 William Davidson, One of the four original founders of the Harley-Davidson Motorcycle Company
 Walter Davidson, President and co-founder of the Harley-Davidson Motorcycle Company
 William Disch, member of the Wisconsin Legislature
 Barney Augustus Eaton, member of the Wisconsin Legislature
 Susan Stuart Frackelton, painter, specializing in painting ceramics
 Oscar M. Fritz, 14th Chief Justice of the Wisconsin Supreme Court
 Ezekiel Gillespie, a Wisconsin agitator for equal rights for African Americans
 Franklin L. Gilson, 32nd Speaker of the Wisconsin State Assembly
 William T. Green, Milwaukee's first black lawyer and civil rights activist
 Charles Hammersley, 1930 candidate for governor
 Harrison Carroll Hobart, Union Army general, 2nd Speaker of the Wisconsin Assembly, 1859 and 1865 gubernatorial candidate
 Edward D. Holton, early Milwaukee business leader, 1853 and 1857 gubernatorial candidate
 Levi Hubbell, 2nd Chief Justice of the Wisconsin Supreme Court, first Wisconsin state official to be impeached
 James Graham Jenkins, Judge of the United States Court of Appeals for the Seventh Circuit
 Louise Phelps Kellogg, historian, writer, and educator
 Byron Kilbourn, American surveyor, railroad executive and co-founder of the City of Milwaukee
 Charles King, U.S. General and distinguished writer
 Abner Kirby, businessman and mayor of Milwaukee
 Increase A. Lapham, author, scientist, and early American naturalist
 John "Babbacombe" Lee, famous for surviving three execution attempts.
 William Lynde, lawyer and Wisconsin politician, Mayor of Milwaukee
 Harrison Ludington, Milwaukee mayor and governor of Wisconsin
 Alfred Lunt & Lynn Fontanne, famous award-winning husband and wife Broadway acting team
 Henry E. McDaniel, U.S. Hall of Fame racehorse trainer
 Francis McGovern, American politician and Wisconsin governor
 Kate Hamilton Pier McIntosh, one of the first women to become a lawyer in Wisconsin
 Edmund T. Melms, American politician
 Andrew Miller, justice of the territorial Wisconsin Supreme Court
 Alexander Mitchell, wealthy banking magnate and Mitchell family patriarch
 Billy Mitchell, U.S. Army general regarded as the father of the U.S. Air Force
 John Mitchell, Senator and father of General Billy Mitchell
 Frederick Pabst, brewing magnate of Pabst Brewing Company fame
 Henry Payne, U.S. Postmaster General
 George Peck, newspaper publisher, mayor of Milwaukee and governor of Wisconsin
 Ole Petersen, founder of Methodism in Norway
 Emanuel Philipp, governor of Wisconsin
 Charles Quentin, Wisconsin state senator
 John Rugee, Wisconsin politician
 Joseph Schlitz (cenotaph), brewing magnate of the now defunct Joseph Schlitz Brewing Company
 Christopher Sholes, inventor of the first practical typewriter with its QWERTY key layout
 William E. Smith, 14th Governor of Wisconsin and co-founder of Roundy's supermarket chain
 Fred W. Springer, Wisconsin politician
 Isaac Stephenson, United States Senator
 John M. Stowell, Mayor of Milwaukee
 Adonis Terry, 19th century Major League Baseball player
 Harvey G. Turner, Wisconsin politician and lawyer
 Robert Uihlein Jr., 1916–1976, president and chairman of the board, Joseph Schlitz Brewing Co., noted polo player,
 Don Upham, United States Attorney and two-term Milwaukee mayor
 George Walker, early settler and co-founder of the City of Milwaukee
 Isaac Walker, U.S. Senator and younger brother of George Walker
 Emil Wallber, Mayor during the Bay View Tragedy
 Daniel Wells Jr., U.S. congressman
 Oscar Werwath, founder of the Milwaukee School of Engineering
 Frederick Charles Winkler, Union Army general
 Carl Zeidler (cenotaph), brother to Frank Zeidler and Milwaukee's "singing mayor"
 Frank Zeidler, three term socialist mayor of Milwaukee and 1976 United States Presidential Candidate

See also 
 List of Milwaukeeans
 List of mayors of Milwaukee
 Lincoln Village, City of Milwaukee, Wisconsin

References

Further reading
 The Forest Home Cemetery, Milwaukee, Wis., with a map of the grounds by Silas Chapman. 1871.
 Silent City: A History of Forest Home Cemetery by John Gurda. 2000.

External links
  
 
 
 
 
 Forest Home Cemetery Burials and Interments
 
 

Cemeteries in Wisconsin
Cemeteries on the National Register of Historic Places in Wisconsin
Buildings and structures in Milwaukee
Geography of Milwaukee
Historic American Landscapes Survey in Wisconsin
Tourist attractions in Milwaukee
Protected areas of Milwaukee County, Wisconsin
Articles containing video clips
National Register of Historic Places in Milwaukee
Rural cemeteries
South Side, Milwaukee